Theodore "Ted" Dallas is the current President and COO of Merakey Inc., a non-profit organization that provides integrated services in the areas of mental health, addictive diseases, autism, education, intellectual/developmental disabilities, juvenile justice, and therapeutic family care to special needs children and adults in the United States. He was the former Pennsylvania Secretary of Human Services under Pennsylvania Governor Tom Wolf from June 2015 until August 2017. Previously, he served as Maryland Secretary of Human Resources from 2011 until 2015 in the administration of Maryland Governor Martin O'Malley.

References

External links
Ted Dallas at the Maryland Manual On-Line

Living people
State cabinet secretaries of Pennsylvania
State cabinet secretaries of Maryland
University of Pennsylvania alumni
Temple University alumni
Year of birth missing (living people)